Kirill Yuryevich Romanov (born 20 January 1990) is a Russian beach soccer player who is playing as forward or defense. Romanov started for TIM and IBS before switching to BSC Kristall, where he is currently serving as captain.

Career
Romanov was born 20 January 1990 in Leningrad. He was introduced to football in Kazakhstan, where his parents emigrated. After returning to Saint Petersburg in 2005 he entered the sports school "Kolomyagi". From 2008 to 2009, Romanov played for TIM and from 2009 to 2012 for IBS, both clubs located in Saint Petersburg. Since the 2011–12 season he is playing for BSC Kristall.

As the captain of BSC Kristall, Romanov scored 206 goals in 384 appearances.

Personal life
Romanov married Irina on 29 September 2017.

Achievements

National team
FIFA Beach Soccer World Cup champion: 2013, 2021
Euro Beach Soccer League champion: 2013, 2014, 2017
Beach Soccer Intercontinental Cup champion: 2012, 2015

Clubs
Russian National Championship champion: 2013, 2015, 2016, 2018, 2019, 2021
Russian Cup champion: 2015, 2017
Russian Super Cup champion: 2018
Euro Winners Cup champion: 2014, 2015

References

External links
Profile on Beach Soccer Russia 
Profile on BSC Kristall 

1990 births
Living people
Russian beach soccer players
Sportspeople from Saint Petersburg
European Games gold medalists for Russia
Beach soccer players at the 2015 European Games
European Games medalists in beach soccer
Beach soccer players at the 2019 European Games